The 2019–20 Ukrainian Second League is the 29th since its establishment. On 6 June 2019 the PFL council of leagues presented its plan draft ("contours") for the next season for both its First and its Second leagues. The final decision for the season was adopted at the 27th PFL Conference that took place on 27 June 2019.

Summary 
The season kicked off on 27 July 2019 along with the First League. Both groups A and B completed their double round-robin tournament on 23 November 2019 before going on winter break. Following the break the spring half of the season that should have started on 21 March 2020 and featured another single round-robin tournament ending on 23 May 2020. On 17 March 2020, the Ukrainian Association of Football adopted its decision to pause all football competitions in the country since 18 March 2020 for unspecified period of time (until adaptation of its next decision to resume all football events) due to the coronavirus pandemic.

On 21 May 2020, the PFL council of leagues at its open-air session at Obolon Arena adopted decision by vote of majority of the Second League clubs to cancel the spring half of the season and recognize winter break standings as final. Also, since the season's calendar was cut short, there were made some additional amendments including rotation of clubs between leagues.

After several PFL meetings, the UAF Executive Committee finally approved completion of the season by decisions of those meetings on 12 June 2020.

The post season games took place in the second half of August, yet beside the championship final (between winners of groups A and B).

Teams

Promoted teams 
Four teams have been promoted from the 2018–19 Ukrainian Football Amateur League:
 FC Uzhhorod – 6th place of Group 1  (debut)
 Alians Lypova Dolyna – 3rd place of Group 2 (debut)
 Dinaz Vyshhorod – 5th place of Group 2 (debut)
 VPK-Ahro Shevchenkivka – 1st place of Group 3 (debut)

Three reserve teams were added also without participation in the Ukrainian Football Amateur League:
 Obolon-Brovar-2 Bucha – (returning after an absence of six seasons, previously as Obolon-2 Kyiv)
 Chornomorets-2 Odesa – (returning after an absence of seven seasons)
 Avanhard-2 Kramatorsk – (debut)

One more team from Ukrainian Amateur Football Championship, FC Peremoha Dnipro, announced that it will contest its certification for professional competitions in the Court of Arbitration for Sport (CAS) in Lausanne against the Ukrainian Association of Football and its licensing committee.

Relegated teams 
The following teams have been relegated from the 2018–19 Ukrainian First League:
 None – PFC Sumy placed 14th place of the 2018–19 Ukrainian First League but had its professional status taken away almost at the end of the season. The club nonetheless played relegation play-off as a de facto non-professional team. On 10 October 2019 the UAF Appellation Committee canceled previous decision of the UAF CDC and sent the case for new investigation. According to chief editor of "Futbol" Artem Frankov, accusations of Francesco Baranca were groundless.

Reorganized/reformed teams 
 FC Nikopol was reorganized from public organization into a community institution of physical culture and sports.
 FC Real Pharma Odesa was reorganized

Withdrawn teams 
 PFC Sumy has been stripped of professional status last season.
 Myr Hornostayivka, the president of the club announced last season that will withdraw the club for the next season.

Location map 
The following map displays the location of teams. Group A teams marked in red. Group B teams marked in green.

Stadiums

Managers

Managerial changes 

Notes:

Group A

Results 

Notes:

Position by round

Top goalscorers

Number of teams by region (Group A)

Group B

Results 

Notes:

Position by round

Top goalscorers

Number of teams by region (Group B)

Post-season play-offs 
Following the season's format change approved on 12 June 2020, the decision about the championship game was never mentioned unlike the promotion/relegation play-offs. According to Article 8.4 of the season's regulations, there is expected to be a championship game. No information about the championship game ever appeared.

Championship game

Promotion play-offs

Awards

Round awards

See also 
 2019–20 Ukrainian Premier League
 2019–20 Ukrainian First League
 2019–20 Ukrainian Football Amateur League
 2019–20 Ukrainian Cup

References 

Ukrainian Second League seasons
2019–20 in Ukrainian association football leagues
Ukraine
Ukraine